Fashanu is a surname. Notable people with the surname include:

Amal Fashanu (born 1988), British presenter, journalist, fashion designer, and activist against homophobia in sport
John Fashanu (born 1962), British television presenter and footballer 
Justin Fashanu (1961–1998), British footballer and gay activist